Henry Wirtz Thomas (October 20, 1812 – June 22, 1890), a Republican politician, served as the 12th Lieutenant Governor of Virginia from 1875 to 1878 under Governor James L. Kemper.

Early life and education 
Henry W. Thomas was born in Leesburg, Virginia in 1812. He attended college in District of Columbia. He studied law and became a lawyer. In 1833, he moved to Fairfax Court House. He was commissioned a Major in the Virginia Militia in 1837.

Politics 
At the age of 26, he was elected Fairfax County Commonwealth's Attorney in 1838. He was a member of the Virginia House of Delegates from 1841 to 1842 and again from 1847 to 1848. He continued his legislative service to the Commonwealth in the Senate of Virginia, serving from 1850 to 1863 and from 1871 to 1875. In 1875, he was elected Lt. Governor.  He also served as a Judge on the Fairfax County Circuit Court from 1866 until shortly before his death.

Death 
Thomas died at his home in Fairfax on June 23, 1890. He is buried in Fairfax City Cemetery in Fairfax.

External links
 

People from Leesburg, Virginia
1812 births
1890 deaths
Lieutenant Governors of Virginia
Virginia Republicans
19th-century American politicians
Politicians from Fairfax, Virginia
Virginia circuit court judges
19th-century American judges